The men's eight was a rowing event held as part of the Rowing at the 1904 Summer Olympics programme. It was the second time the event was held at the Olympics. The competition was held on Saturday, July 30, 1904. Two crews, one from the United States and one from Canada, competed. The American team won, successfully defending their Olympic title from 1900.

Background

This was the second appearance of the event. Rowing had been on the programme in 1896 but was cancelled due to bad weather. The men's eight has been held every time that rowing has been contested, beginning in 1900.

As in 1900, the United States was represented by the Vesper Boat Club of Philadelphia. Two members of the team that won a gold medal in Paris returned: coxswain Louis Abell and stroke John Exley. Their only opponent in St. Louis was the Canadian team, from the Toronto Argonaut Rowing Club.

It was Canada's debut in the event. The United States was the only nation to have competed in both editions so far.

Competition format

The "eight" event featured nine-person boats, with eight rowers and a coxswain. It was a sweep rowing event, with the rowers each having one oar (and thus each rowing on one side). The distance for the race was 2 miles (3218 metres), rather than the 2000 metres which was becoming standard even at the time (and has been used in the Olympics since 1912, except in 1948). It was by far the longest distance used in the Games, over the 1.5 mile (2412 metres) course in London in 1908.

With only two boats, the competition consisted of a single race.

Schedule

Results

The American team won the race by three lengths.

References

Sources
 

Rowing at the 1904 Summer Olympics